Steeles Tavern (formerly Midway) is an unincorporated community in Augusta County and Rockbridge County, Virginia. It lies at an elevation of 1683 feet (513 m).

The Cyrus McCormick Farm was listed on the National Register of Historic Places in 1966.

References

Unincorporated communities in Augusta County, Virginia
Unincorporated communities in Rockbridge County, Virginia
Unincorporated communities in Virginia